"(Sittin' On) The Dock of the Bay" is a song co-written by soul singer Otis Redding and guitarist Steve Cropper. It was recorded by Redding twice in 1967, including once just three days before his death in a plane crash on December 10, 1967. The song was released on Stax Records' Volt label in 1968, becoming the first ever posthumous single to top the charts in the US. It reached number 3 on the UK Singles Chart.

Redding started writing the lyrics to the song in August 1967, while sitting on a rented houseboat in Sausalito, California. He completed the song in Memphis with the help of Cropper, who was a Stax producer and the guitarist for Booker T. & the M.G.'s. The song features whistling and sounds of waves crashing on a shore.

Origins
While on tour with the Bar-Kays in August 1967, Redding had grown in popularity, and was inundated with fans at his hotel in downtown San Francisco.  Rock concert impresario Bill Graham offered Redding a respite to stay at his houseboat at Waldo Point Harbor in Sausalito, California.   It is there where he started writing the lines,  “Sittin’ in the morning sun, I’ll be sittin’ when the evening comes” and the first verse of the song, under the abbreviated title "Dock of the Bay.” 

He had completed his famed performance at the Monterey Pop Festival just weeks earlier. While touring in support of the albums King & Queen (a collaboration with female vocalist Carla Thomas) and Live in Europe, he continued to scribble lines of the song on napkins and hotel paper. In November of that year, he joined producer and guitarist Steve Cropper at the Stax recording studio in Memphis, Tennessee, to record the song.

In a September 1990 interview on NPR's Fresh Air, Cropper explained the origins of the song:

Together, they completed the music and melancholic lyrics of "(Sittin' On) The Dock of the Bay." From those sessions emerged Redding's final recorded work, including "Dock of the Bay," which was recorded on November 22, with additional overdubs on December 7. Redding's restrained yet emotive delivery is backed by Cropper's succinct guitar playing. The song is somewhat different in style from most of Redding's other recordings. While discussing the song with his wife, Redding stated that he had wanted to "be a little different" with "The Dock of the Bay" and "change his style". There were concerns that "The Dock of the Bay" had too much of a pop feel for an Otis Redding record, and contracting the Stax gospel act the Staple Singers to record backing vocals was discussed but never carried out. Redding had considered the song to be unfinished and planned to record what he considered a final version, but never got the chance. The song features a whistled tune heard before it fades, however it is unclear who performed it. Some sources claim Sam Taylor, a guitarist/bandleader for Redding during the 1960s, overdubbed Redding's original, weaker whistle. Cropper, however, insists that Redding's original whistle was used on the final cut. Redding continued to tour after the recording sessions. On December 10, his charter plane crashed into Lake Monona, outside Madison, Wisconsin. Redding and six others were killed.

After Redding's death, Cropper mixed "Dock of the Bay" at Stax Studios. He added the sound of seagulls and waves crashing to the background, as Redding had requested, recalling the sounds he heard when he was staying on the houseboat.

Personnel

 Otis Redding – vocals
 Booker T. Jones – keyboards
 Steve Cropper – guitar
 Donald Dunn – bass guitar
 Al Jackson Jr. – drums
 Wayne Jackson – trumpet, trombone
 Andrew Love – saxophone

Charts

Weekly charts

Year-end charts

All-time charts

Certifications

Reception

Phil Walden and Jim Stewart were among those who had doubts about the song, the sound, and the production. Redding accepted some of the criticisms and fine-tuned the song. He reversed the opening, which was Redding's whistling part, and put it at the end as suggested. "The Dock of the Bay" was released early in 1968 and topped the charts in the US and UK. Billboard ranked the record as the number 4 song for 1968.

Universal success
"(Sittin' On) The Dock of the Bay" was released in January 1968, shortly after Redding's death. R&B stations quickly added the song to their playlists, which had been saturated with Redding's previous hits. The song shot to number one on the R&B charts in early 1968 and, starting in March, topped the pop charts for four weeks. The album, which shared the song's title, became his largest-selling to date, peaking at number four on the pop albums chart. "Dock of the Bay" was popular in countries across the world and became Redding's most successful record, selling more than four million copies worldwide. The song went on to win two Grammy Awards: Best R&B Song and Best Male R&B Vocal Performance.

Legacy
Redding's body of work at the time of his death was immense, including a backlog of archived recordings as well as those created in November and December 1967, just before his death. In mid-1968, Stax Records severed its distribution contract with Atlantic Records, which retained the label's back catalog and the rights to the unreleased Otis Redding masters. Through its Atco subsidiary (Atco had distributed Otis Redding's releases from Stax's Volt label), Atlantic issued three more albums of new Redding material, one live album, and eight singles between 1968 and 1970. Reprise Records issued a live album featuring Redding and Jimi Hendrix at the Monterey Pop Festival. Both studio albums and anthologies sold well in America and abroad. Redding was especially successful in the United Kingdom, where The Dock of the Bay went to number one, becoming the first posthumous album to reach the top spot there.

In 1999, BMI named the song as the sixth-most performed song of the twentieth century, with about six million performances. Rolling Stone ranked The Dock of the Bay number 161 on its 500 Greatest Albums of All Time, the third of five Redding albums on the list. "(Sittin' On) The Dock of the Bay" was ranked twenty-sixth on Rolling Stones 500 Greatest Songs of All Time, the second-highest of four Redding songs on the list, after "Respect" (in this case the version recorded by Aretha Franklin).

Jim Morrison made reference to "Dock of the Bay" in the Doors' song "Runnin' Blue", written by Robby Krieger, from their 1969 album The Soft Parade. Morrison sings an a capella intro for the song, singing directly about Otis Redding. "Poor Otis dead and gone, left me here to sing his song, pretty little girl with a red dress on, poor Otis dead and gone." And during the verse, the lyrics "Got to find a dock and a bay" appear more than once; as well as several other references to Redding's song.

In 2013, Redding’s son, Otis Redding III performed the song at a ribbon cutting ceremony for the Brannan Street Wharf on the Embarcadero in the South Beach neighborhood in San Francisco.  The lyrics to the song are embronzed there on a plaque.   That has led to confusion for some to believe Redding actually wrote the song there, especially since the lyrics reference the “Frisco Bay”.  In actuality, the song was written 10 miles north up in Sausalito, as Redding was watching the “ships come in” on the Richardson Bay.

Michael Bolton version

Michael Bolton included the song on his 1987 album The Hunger. His version peaked number 11 on the Billboard Hot 100 and number 12 on the Album Rock Tracks chart. The version also peaked number three in Australia, number five in Norway, and number eight in New Zealand.

Zelma Redding, Otis's widow, said she was so moved by Bolton's performance "that it brought tears to my eyes. It reminded me so much of my husband that I know if he heard it, he would feel the same." In a framed letter that hangs on the wall of Bolton's office, she referred to the record as "my all-time favorite version of my husband's classic."

Charts

Other cover versions

Several other versions of the song have charted on the Billboard Hot 100 in the United States. King Curtis' version charted for five weeks starting in March 1968 and peaked at number 84 (during the same month, the original was number one). A year later, Sergio Mendes & Brasil '66's version charted for five weeks starting in June 1969 and peaked at number 66.

Sammy Hagar released a version of the song as a non-album single in 1979. His version features the song's co-writer, Steve Cropper, on guitar and members of the band Boston—Brad Delp, Sib Hashian and Barry Goudreau—on backup vocals. Music critic Thor Christensen in 1994 listed the Sammy Hagar version as one of the "five worst song remakes". It charted for five weeks starting in April 1979, peaking at number 65.

The Reddings, who included two of Otis Redding's sons, released a version which charted for nine weeks starting in June 1982 and peaked at number 55.

References

Bibliography

External links
 Inside Otis Redding's "(Sittin' On) The Dock of the Bay"
 

Songs about oceans and seas
Songs about boats
1968 singles
Otis Redding songs
Songs about San Francisco
Songs about Georgia (U.S. state)
Little Richard songs
David Allan Coe songs
Michael Bolton songs
Peggy Lee songs
Sammy Hagar songs
Waylon Jennings songs
Willie Nelson songs
Jimmy Velvit songs
Glen Campbell songs
Songs written by Otis Redding
Billboard Hot 100 number-one singles
Songs released posthumously
Songs written by Steve Cropper
RCA Records singles
Atco Records singles
Stax Records singles
Capitol Records singles
Columbia Records singles
1968 songs